"After You" is a song by British band Pulp released as a single in January 2013, the first new single by the band in eleven years.

Background
The song had been originally demoed during early sessions to We Love Life, the band's seventh and last studio album to date. The song wasn't finished and remained unreleased like several other songs from that period.
Pulp finally went back to finish the song in late 2012 during their successful comeback 2011-2012 tour.

Release
"After You" was originally released as free download for those who received a Christmas card at Pulp's hometown show at the Motorpoint Arena on 8 December 2012. The card contained a unique code to give access to a downloadable gift, which was made available after midnight on Christmas Eve. The song finally received a commercial release in January 2013, in a form of download single.

The band performed "After You" on The Jonathan Ross Show on 9 February 2013.

The song was remixed by Soulwax and released on 12" vinyl especially for the 2013 Record Store Day.

Uses on other media
The Soulwax remix of "After You" was featured in the video game Grand Theft Auto V on the game's radio station Soulwax FM.

Personnel
Jarvis Cocker: Lead Vocals
James Murphy: Percussion, Handclaps, Backing Vocals
Candida Doyle: Synthesizers 
Mark Webber: Acoustic Guitar
Russell Senior: Electric Guitars
Steve Mackey: Bass Guitar
Nick Banks: Drums

Track listing

Digital download
 "After You" - 5:35

12" (RTRADST699)
 "After You" (Soulwax Remix)
 "After You" (Original Version) 	
 "After You" (The 4am Desperation Disco To Disco Dub Version)

Chart positions

References

Pulp (band) songs
2013 singles
Songs written by Jarvis Cocker
Songs written by Candida Doyle
Songs written by Nick Banks
Songs written by Steve Mackey
Songs written by Mark Webber (guitarist)